Paul Codd (born 1 December 1976 in Rathnure, County Wexford) is an Irish sportsperson.  He plays hurling with his local club Rathnure and was a member of the Wexford senior inter-county team from 1995 until 2006. He captained Wexford. He was introduced as a substitute in the dying minutes of the 1996 All-Ireland Hurling Championship final which Wexford won.

References

 

1976 births
Living people
Rathnure hurlers
Wexford inter-county hurlers
All-Ireland Senior Hurling Championship winners